(lit. 'Conservation Science') is an annual open-access academic journal of conservation science particularly as applied to the Cultural Properties of Japan. It is published in Japanese with summaries in English by the Tokyo Research Institute for Cultural Properties.

See also
 Conservation Techniques for Cultural Properties

References

External links 
 

Japanese art
Japanese-language journals
Publications established in 1964
Open access journals
Conservation and restoration of cultural heritage
Annual journals
Arts journals